The Regiment "Cavalleggeri di Alessandria" (14th) ( - "Chevau-légers of Alessandria") is an inactive cavalry unit of the Italian Army. The unit was last active from 1964 to 1979 as reconnaissance squadron of the Infantry Division "Granatieri di Sardegna".

History

Formation 
On 3 January 1850 the Regiment "Cavalleggeri di Alessandria" was formed in Casale Monferrato, with two squadrons transferred from the Regiment "Cavalleggeri di Novara" and two squadrons transferred from the Regiment "Cavalleggeri di Aosta". The regiment's depot squadron was formed with personnel transferred from the Regiment "Piemonte Reale Cavalleria".

In 1855 the regiment's commander and staff were used to form then headquarter of the Provisional Light Cavalry Regiment of the Sardinian expeditionary corps, which fought in the Crimean War. The structure of the Provisional Light Cavalry Regiment was as follows:

 Provisional Light Cavalry Regiment
 Regimental Staff, from the Regiment "Cavalleggeri di Alessandria"
 1st Squadron - 1st Squadron of the Regiment "Cavalleggeri di Novara"
 2nd Squadron - 1st Squadron of the Regiment "Cavalleggeri di Aosta"
 3rd Squadron - 1st Squadron of the Regiment "Cavalleggeri di Saluzzo" 
 4th Squadron - 1st Squadron of the Regiment "Cavalleggeri di Monferrato"
 5th Squadron - 1st Squadron of the Regiment "Cavalleggeri di Alessandria"

The Provisional Light Cavalry Regiment distinguished itself on 16 August 1855 in the Battle of the Chernaya. After the war the regiment was disbanded on 18 June 1856 and the squadrons returned to their regiments.

During the Second Italian War of Independence in 1859 the regiment fought in the Battle of Palestro and the Battle of San Martino. For its conduct in the war the regiment was awarded a Bronze Medal of Military Valour. In 1862-64 the regiment sent two squadrons to Sicily and Campania to suppress the anti-Sardinian revolt in Southern Italy after the Kingdom of Sardinia had invaded and annexed the Kingdom of Two Sicilies.

In 1866 the regiment participated in the Third Italian War of Independence and distinguished itself in the Battle of Custoza, for which the regiment was awarded a Silver Medal of Military Valour. Over the next years the regiment repeatedly changed its name:

 10 September 1871: 14th Regiment of Cavalry (Alessandria)
 5 November 1876: Cavalry Regiment "Alessandria" (14th)
 16 December 1897: Regiment "Cavalleggeri di Alessandria" (14th)

In 1887 the regiment contributed to the formation of the 1st Cavalry Squadron Africa and the Mounted Hunters Squadron, which fought in the Italo-Ethiopian War of 1887–1889. In 1895-96 the regiment provided 73 enlisted personnel for units deployed to Italian Eritrea for the First Italo-Ethiopian War. In 1911-12 the regiment provided 108 enlisted personnel to augment units fighting in the Italo-Turkish War. Between the Second Italian War of Independence and World War I the Alessandria ceded on five occasions one of its squadrons to help form new Chevau-légers regiments:

 16 September 1859: Regiment "Cavalleggeri di Lodi" (15th)
 16 February 1864: Regiment "Lancieri di Foggia" (later renamed: Regiment "Cavalleggeri di Foggia" 11th))
 1 October 1883: Regiment "Cavalleggeri di Catania" (22nd)
 1 November 1887: Regiment "Cavalleggeri di Vicenza" (24th)
 1 October 1909: Regiment "Cavalleggeri di Treviso" (28th)

World War I 

At the outbreak of World War I the regiment consisted of a command, the regimental depot, and two cavalry groups, with the I Group consisting of three squadrons and the II Group consisting of two squadrons and a machine gun section. In 1917 the regimental depot in Lucca formed the 855th Dismounted Machine Gunners Company as reinforcement for infantry units on the front. In 1916 the regiment distinguished itself in the Sixth Battle of the Izono. After the Italian defeat in the Battle of Caporetto the regiment covered the retreat of the IV Army Corps to the Piave river and fought delaying actions at Idrsko, Caporetto, Stupizza, Sequals, Marano, and Zugliano. The regiment lost half its men before crossing the Piave river to safety.

In 1918 the regiment fought in the Second Battle of the Piave River. After the Italian victory in the Battle of Vittorio Veneto, the regiment, like all cavalry regiments, was ordered to advance as fast as far as possible and so on 1 November 1918 the regiment reached Rovereto and on 3 November 1918 Trento. In the following days the regiment advanced to Mezzocorona and Salurn.

Interwar years 
After the war the Italian Army disbanded 14 of its 30 cavalry regiments and so on 21 November 1919 the II Group of the Alessandria was renamed "Cavalleggeri di Treviso" as it consisted of personnel and horses from the disbanded Regiment "Cavalleggeri di Treviso" (28th). In 1920 the Alessandria moved from Lucca to Florence, where it took over the barracks of the "Cavalleggeri di Treviso". On 20 May 1920 the Alessandria received and integrated a squadron from the disbanded Regiment "Cavalleggeri di Lodi" (15th), which before had been one of the squadrons of the Regiment "Cavalleggeri di Udine" (29th). On the same date the Alessandria also received the traditions of the disbanded Regiment "Cavalleggeri di Treviso" (28th).

In 1930 the regiment moved from Florence to Palmanova, where it joined the 1st Cavalry Division

On 1 January 1934 the regiment left the division and in 1935-36 the Alessandria contributed 15 officers and 220 enlisted for units, which were deployed to East Africa for the Second Italo-Ethiopian War. In October 1938 the Cavalleggeri di Alessandria were once again assigned to the 1st Cavalry Division.

World War II 

At the outbreak of World War II the regiment consisted of a command, a command squadron, the I and II squadrons groups, each with two mounted squadrons, and the 5th Machine Gunners Squadron. The regiment was assigned to the 1st Cavalry Division "Eugenio di Savoia", which participated in the Invasion of Yugoslavia and afterwards remained in Yugoslavia as occupation force. On 17 October 1941 the Alessandria conducted the last cavalry charge in Italian military history: encircled by Yugoslav Partisans near Poloj in Croatia the regiment launched repeated nighttime saber charges against the partisans and despite suffering heavy casualties, succeeded to break through the encirclement.

On 16 February 1943 the regiment's commanding officer Colonel Guido da Zara was killed in an ambush by Yugoslav Partisans. After the announcement of the Armistice of Cassibile on 8 September 1943 the division tried to rally in Rijeka, but by 12 September 1943 it was dissolved by invading German forces.

During the war the regiment's depot in Palmanova formed the:
 III Tank Group "Cavalleggeri di Alessandria", with L6/40 tanks
 IV Tank Group "Cavalleggeri di Alessandria", with L6/40 tanks
 VII Road Movement Battalion "Cavalleggeri di Alessandria"
 XII Road Movement Battalion "Cavalleggeri di Alessandria" (lost on 24 May 1941 in the sinking of the SS Conte Rosso)
 XII Dismounted Group "Cavalleggeri di Alessandria"
 XIII Self-propelled Anti-tank Group "Cavalleggeri di Alessandria", with Semovente da 47/32

In summer 1942 the XIII Self-propelled Anti-tank Squadrons Group was attached to the 3rd Cavalry Division "Principe Amedeo Duca d'Aosta" and sent to the Soviet Union. Division and squadrons group were destroyed during the Soviet Operation Little Saturn in winter 1942-43.

Cold War 
During the Cold War the Infantry Division "Granatieri di Sardegna" was the Italian Army's main fighting force in Central Italy, with the division's 3rd Armored Infantry Regiment based in Persano near Naples. As the regiment also served as training unit for the Mechanized and Armored Troops School in Caserta the regiment, unlike other armored infantry regiments of the Italian Army, included a self-propelled artillery battery. In 1964 the army decided to augment the regiment with a reconnaissance squadron and so on 1 October 1964 the Squadron "Cavalleggeri di Alessandria" was formed in Persano.

During the 1975 army reform the 3rd Armored Infantry Regiment was disbanded on 1 October 1975 and the Squadron "Cavalleggeri di Alessandria" renamed 14th Reconnaissance Squadron "Cavalleggeri di Alessandria". The squadron was assigned to the Mechanized Brigade "Granatieri di Sardegna" and moved from Persano to Civitavecchia near Rome. On 30 June 1979 the squadron was disbanded and the traditions of the Regiment "Cavalleggeri di Alessandria" (14th) were transferred to the Regiment "Lancieri di Montebello" (8th).

References

Cavalry Regiments of Italy